Wairoa District Council is the territorial authority for the Wairoa District of New Zealand.

The council is led by the mayor of Wairoa, who is currently .

There are also six councillors, representing the district at large.

References

External links

 Official website

Wairoa District
Politics of the Hawke's Bay Region
Territorial authorities of New Zealand